Blepharis edulis (Hindi : uttanjan) is a species of plant in the family Acanthaceae. It is found in India, Pakistan and Iran as well as Egypt (including the Sinai Peninsula). It is a small plant, covered in soft, grey hairs. It has many serrated leaves, that have prickles attached to them. The flowers are a yellowish color. Its capsules contain two seeds, that are heart-shaped, smooth, shining, and  brownish in color. In India it is commonly known as the Dakhni chappar or Utangan.

In medicine
The seeds, leaves, and roots of this plant are used for various medicinal purposes in India. The leaves are used in the treating of tridosha fevers, urinary discharges, leucoderma, nasal haemorrhage, asthma, cough and inflammation of throat, and mental derangements, and usually have beneficial effects on wounds and ulcers. They can also be used for treating ascites, liver, and spleen disorders. The leaves . The seeds can cure strangury, and are also beneficial in diseases of the blood, chest, lungs and liver. The roots regulate the menstruation in women.

Phytochemicals such as benzoxazine glucosides and banzoxazolone are present in this species, and antixoidants like phenolic acids and flavone glycosides are also confirmed present. The plant is also established to show anticancer activity.

References

edulis
Taxa named by Peter Forsskål